Lorna Srimathie Dewaraja (born 1929; died 2014) was a Sri Lankan historian.

Biography 
Dewaraja graduated from the University of Ceylon, followed by postgraduate studies at the University of London. She was a faculty member of the University of Colombo. In 1992 she was awarded a Fulbright Program scholarship to study the history of women in south Asia.

Publications 

 Dewaraja, L. S. (1972). A Study of the Political, Administrative, and Social Structure of the Kandyan Kingdom of Ceylon, 1707-1760. Colombo: Lake House Investments.
--do.-- (1988) The Kandyan Kingdom of Sri Lanka, 1707-1782; 2nd rev. ed. Colombo, Sri Lanka: Lake House Investments ISBN 9555520186
 Dewaraja, L. S. (1981). The Position of Women in Buddhism. Kandy: Buddhist Publication Society.
 Dewaraja, L. S. (2019). The Muslims of Sri Lanka: One thousand years of ethnic harmony, 900-1915.
--do.-- (1989) Sri Lanka through French Eyes, Sri Lanka: Institute of Fundamental Studies ISBN 9552600030

References

1929 births
2014 deaths
20th-century Sri Lankan historians
Alumni of the University of Ceylon
Alumni of the University of London
People from British Ceylon
21st-century Sri Lankan historians